Portezuelo is a municipality located in the province of Cáceres, Extremadura, Spain. According to the 2013 census (INE), the municipality has a population of 262 inhabitants.

External links
Website of municipality

References

 auto

Municipalities in the Province of Cáceres